The following is a list of the cast and characters from the NBC television series Grimm.

Main characters

Nick Burkhardt

Nicholas Burkhardt (played by David Giuntoli) is the show's protagonist and titular Grimm. Nick is a homicide detective who discovers he is descended from a line of Grimms, hunters who fight supernatural forces. Even before his abilities manifested, Nick had an exceptional ability to make quick and accurate deductions about individuals' motivations and pasts. This power has now expressed itself in his ability to perceive the supernatural that nobody else can see. Nick had wanted to propose to his girlfriend, Juliette, for some time, but he felt that he would have to tell her about his life as a Grimm beforehand.

Throughout the first season, Nick struggles to balance his normal life and life as a Grimm. When he works cases involving Wesen, which are creatures from the Grimm world, the two frequently cross paths. As Nick dives deeper into his Grimm heritage, he begins to train with Monroe to learn about the Wesen in Portland and to use the weapons that his aunt Marie left behind. As of episode 19, Nick had successfully killed three reapers, creatures that are sent out to kill Grimms (hence the Grimm reaper title). He kills the first in defense of Marie, and the other two are killed in self-defense after being sent as Nick's lead suspect in a case. The latter two have their heads returned home with a note instructing them to send the best the next time. In the season finale, Nick's worries about a scratch Juliette received from Adalind's cat force him to reveal his Grimm heritage to her, which makes Juliette believe he has gone crazy. When bringing her to the trailer is not enough to convince her, they go to Monroe's house so that Nick can show her his blutbad form, though before Monroe can show her, Juliette collapses. Rosalee discovers that Juliette is going through memory loss, but when Juliette wakes up, the only thing she has forgotten is Nick.

Nick, after believing for eighteen years that both of his parents died in a car crash, discovers that his mother is alive and well in the first episode of season two. At this time, but he still does not know her true motives or agenda. At the end of season three, Nick's Grimm powers are removed by Adalind as a result of sleeping with her – she had disguised herself as Juliette. He regains his powers in "Highway Of Tears."

Nick later learns that Adalind is pregnant with his child, which is revealed to be a boy when Adalind gives birth. She names the boy "Kelly" after Nick's mother. At the beginning of Season 5, Nick and the group become involved in a secret war between Hadrian's Wall (HW) – a secret government organization that Trubel and Meisner are a part of, and Black Claw, a worldwide Wesen revolutionary group. Nick sells his home and buys a secret, fortified loft to better protect Adalind and Kelly. As Nick and Adalind raise Kelly together, they grow closer, and Nick shows himself to be a devoted father. At the end of "Wesen Nacht," Nick is shocked to learn that Juliette has survived, Wesen Nacht and is now working for HW under the new persona of Eve. In "Map of the Seven KnightsWesen Nacht," Nick comes into contact with Monroe's uncle, who is killed by Black Claw. After avenging his murder, Nick acquires twenty new Grimm books, a new cache of weapons, and three more map keys. With these, he figures out the location of the Templar's hidden treasure. In "Key Move" and "Into the Schwarzwald," Nick and Monroe travel to Germany to find this treasure. The group discovers that the treasure is a stick of wood with healing properties. Nick learns that Renard is working with Black Claw to become Mayor and that Renard may use Diana to get to Adalind. Rosalee reveals to Nick that Adalind's Hexenbiest powers have returned while he was in Germany, but states he should not let Adalind discover he knows until Adalind herself tells him. Adalind is forced by Renard, Bonaparte, and, unknowingly, Diana, to take Kelly and leave Nick. Nick becomes distraught over losing his son and girlfriend and fights hard to get them back, which culminates in a vicious fight between him and Renard at the police station. Nick is arrested for assault but is later set free by Eve, Trubel, and Wu. Diana warns Nick that Black Claw is coming for them. He subsequently leads the group into a tunnel underneath his loft while he stays behind to deal with the attackers. Despite overwhelming numbers and the stick's healing powers, Nick kills all of the assailants before being confronted byh Renard and Bonaparte Into the Schwarzwald. Diana, who learned Bonaparte had tortured Adalind to reveal their location, kills Bonaparte before Nick can .

It is assumed that Nick and Adalind got married sometime after the series finale.

Hank Griffin

Hank Griffin (played by Russell Hornsby) is Nick's detective partner and best friend who, like Juliette, was not aware that Nick is a Grimm until season 2. He is sarcastic at times and had gone through at least four marriages by the time the series begins. Throughout the first season, Hank starts to notice the strange occurrences in Portland and in some of the cases he works on with Nick. Adalind, in an attempt to get closer to Nick, gave Hank a "lovesick" potion that caused him to develop obsessive behavior towards her. In "Big Feet," Hank accidentally runs into a transformed Monroe, who was leading search dogs away from a friend of his. This, combined with seeing a dead suspect change back into human form, causes Hank to have nightmares and paranoia when he is home. In "Bad Moon Rising," Hank starts to doubt whether he can continue police work given his state of mind.

When searching for the missing daughter of an old friend from high school, Hank learns Nick is a Grimm. Hank tells Nick that he is comfortable knowing the truth, reflecting that, while he may be crazy, at least there is someone else who is crazy as well. After this, Hank becomes increasingly invested in the Wesen world, even participating in Nick's hunts to stop enemy Wesen. In season 3, when Wu first encounters the Wesen world, Hank wants to reveal everything so that Wu does not face the same issues he did. In "Wesenrein," Hank tells Wu that he related to him, having been in the same position himself. In Season 5, Hank joins Hadrian's Wall, a secret government organization fighting a worldwide Wesen revolutionary group known as Black Claw. He soon starts a relationship with his former physical therapist, Zuri (also a Wesen), whom he later discovers to be working with Black Claw.

Juliette Silverton / Eve

Juliette Silverton (seasons 1 to 4), later Eve (seasons 5 & 6), (played by Bitsie Tulloch) is Nick's girlfriend. She works as a veterinarian, and spent much of her childhood with her grandmother in Spain, which made her fluent in Castilian Spanish (although her accent is similar to that found in Latin America). Although Marie suggested that Nick should leave Juliette for her safety, he decided to stay with her. He postponed his original plans to propose to her while he explored his new life as a Grimm. However, in "The Thing with Feathers," he proposes, only for her to turn him down because she felt he was hiding something. In "Woman in Black," Juliette suffers a scratch while treating Adalind Schade's cat. When Nick reacts with horror, Juliette demands he tell her what's going on. Nick tries to explain by bringing her to the trailer and then to Monroe, but Juliette falls unconscious and is taken to the hospital.

She eventually awakens from her coma with help from Rosalee, and a potion prepared for and delivered by Renard. Due to a spell, all her memories of Nick have been erased – though she can remember everything else about her life. She begins to develop an unusual attraction to Captain Renard due to his role in awakening her. She fights this attraction due to her complicated relationship with Nick. After drinking a potion to break the compulsive attraction, she starts hallucinating sounds and images, such as imagining that the floor of her house had collapsed. She thinks that she is going crazy, but is really regaining her memories of Nick. In "One Angry Fuchsbau," she begins seeing many clear visions of Nick, which overwhelms her. Seeking help, she contacts the Mexican woman she met in "La Llorona" who tells her to concentrate on La Llorona a single memory at a time to completely remember them. In "Kiss of the Muse," she returns to the trailer by herself and remembers what Nick told her the first night she went there. In "The Waking Dead," Juliette convinces Monroe to tell her the truth about Grimms and the Wesen world, which he, along with Rosalee and Bud, do by wogeing in front of her. From this point on, she starts to become increasingly interested in Nick's Grimm activities and joins him and his allies in fighting zombies. She later helps Nico find a cure for a rare disease that gives humans a ghostly appearance.

She becomes a Hexenbiest after using a spell to sleep with Nick to give him back his Grimm powers, which leads to drastic changes in her personality. She becomes far colder and less empathetic, starting fights with everyone she comes across, and she begins to enjoy the powers she now possesses. She begins working for the royals after learning Adalind had become pregnant with Nick's child. She sets fire to Nick's trailer and lures his mother into a trap so that the royals can take Diana. She was later killed by Trubel in the Season 4 finale, "Cry Havoc," after trying to kill Nick.

However, Hadrian's Wall saved her life, broke her down to nothing, and then rebuilt her as an emotionally distant assassin called Eve. Having conquered her rage and properly practiced her powers, Eve becomes incredibly powerful, able to kill twenty Black Claw members by herself. She goes to any extreme to complete her missions, such as assassinate a known Black Claw organizer in a crowded restaurant or breathing in a potion to transform herself into Renard to learn of their leaders. However, Eve still has remnants of Juliette's personality. She is drawn to Nick due to their past and threatens Adalind not to hurt him. In "The Beginning of the End," Eve is gravely injured by the Black Claw leader, Bonaparte, who is a powerful magician in his own right. When Nick saves her with the Templar treasure (a wooden stick with healing properties), she suffers a seizure. Upon awakening, she is very emotional and confused, leading Nick to wonder if Juliette has returned.

Monroe

Monroe (played by Silas Weir Mitchell) is a creature of the Grimm world (a wieder blutbad) who aids Nick with his cases. He becomes a good friend of Nick's, even though he has some issues with Grimms since a Grimm killed his grandfather. Monroe had not known that there were any Grimms left until he meets Nick. In the first season, Monroe is attacked by the reapers because he helps Nick with his cases. After the attack, Nick tells Monroe that he will not ask for any more assistance. Monroe, despite his occasional dissatisfaction with the demands Nick places on him, decides to continue helping Nick, saying that he enjoys disrupting the "status quo." Monroe is knowledgeable about the supernatural creatures that Nick goes up against. Whenever the second-hand knowledge that Nick acquires from his ancestors' books is inadequate, Monroe serves as Nick's direct source of insight and information. He also helps make contact with creatures that would avoid Nick due to his status as a Grimm, and assists Nick when cases require him to rely on someone who knows about the threats he faces.

In "Big Feet," when Monroe's friend is injured and suffering from the side effects of an experimental drug, he takes his friend's jacket and makes the search dogs chase him. While being chased in the forest, he is surrounded by the search dogs and transforms into his blutbad form to scare them off, but runs into Hank when he heads back to his house. Because he allowed his changed form to be seen by normal beings, Hank was able to see it before he ran off. In "Woman in Black," Nick brings Juliette over to Monroe's place so that he can change in front of her, to prove his Grimm heritage. However, before Monroe can allow himself to be seen by her, Juliette collapses from the scratch made by Adalind's cat.

Monroe explores a relationship with Rosalee, although they are taking their time due to their pre-existing friendship. While running the spice shop, Monroe comes into contact with Sean Renard, who complains of obsessive behavior. Monroe says he can make the compulsions go away, but he needs both Sean and the person he is obsessed with together. In "To Protect and Serve Man," he discovers that the obsession Sean has been fighting against is for Juliette, which puts him in a very difficult and awkward situation. He and Rosalee help Juliette and Captain Renard break the bond between them. In season 3 "A Dish Best Served Cold," Monroe asks Rosalee to move in with him which she does in the next episode, "One Night Stand." Monroe and Rosalee get married in "Blond Ambition."

In season 4, an old medieval Wesen group, whose goal is to keep Wesen pure (no hybridization or inter-Wesen marriages), capture Monroe and attempt sto kill him for his "crimes." He is later freed with the help of Nick and Rosalee, among others. In season 5, Monroe is drawn into the war between Hadrian's Wall and Black Claw. He is concerned for Rosalee when her ex-boyfriend, Tony, begins reaching out to her. The battle becomes personal for him when his uncle, who had recently acquired a large number of Grimm books for Nick, is murdered by Black Claw. Upon learning the location of the Templar's treasure, Monroe and Nick travel to Germany to find it, but Monroe is bitten and his wound becomes infected by the time they get back. The treasure is a piece of wood that somehow heals Monroe's wound. In the last two episodes of season 5, Monroe comes face-to-face with Tony when it is discovered that Tony is a member of Black Claw. Upon escaping Black Claw's clutches, Rosalee reveals she is pregnant with his child, which delights him.

His last name has not been stated so far. In a phone call, his parents called him Monroe, seeming to indicate that it is his first name. However, the season 1 boxset features stated Monroe's name as 'Eddie Monroe,' though actor Silas Weir Mitchell has since dismissed this as Monroe's full name.

Sean Renard

Sean Renard (played by Sasha Roiz) is a politically adept police captain who is Nick's superior officer. Unknown to Nick during the first season, Renard is a human–creature hybrid with magical abilities called a Zauberbiest (the male form of Hexenbiest). In "Last Grimm Standing," he is addressed as Your Highness, implying that he belongs to royalty in the creature community, and he is later revealed to be a prince connected to royal blood. He references my canton, which implies that he has a leadership role. This is emphasized when he appears to protect Wesen from engaging in illicit acts. In "The Kiss," he consumed a potion to make him pure of heart so that he could wake Juliette, wanting to keep her active so that he could ensure Nick's continued presence in his city. In "The Other Side," his brother, Eric, mentioned to Adalind that Sean's mother was a Hexenbiest and that he only had royal blood on one side of his family – this is one reason why Catherine Schade referred to him as a bastard. As a result of his illegitimate status, he and his mother were forced to flee from Europe. He now considers himself independent of the royal families and is a known ally of the resistance against them. He developed an attraction to Juliette due to his role in awakening her from the coma but attempts to resist it. He, Nick, and Juliette all drink a potion mixed by Rosalee that breaks the compulsion.

Since the revelation of his heritage, Sean has been more open with Nick about Grimm-related cases. He admits that he is distant from his family and prefers Nick over them. He is the father of Adalind's daughter Diana, who has unique powers.

During season 4, he experiences moments of unexplained bleeding after his mother saves his life using an ancient spell. It is revealed after the season that the bleeding is a result of him being "possessed" by the spirit of Jack the Ripper – who was a killer of Wesen in life – until the rest of the team can "exorcise" Jack from his body.

In season 5, he is subtly manipulated by the pro-Wesen group, Black Claw, to take on the role of running for mayor, eventually coming to favor their power campaign. However, after he attempts to get Nick and his allies accused of murder, Nick can get Renard to step down as mayor. Nick does this by using a complex spell to turn himself into Renard and publicly abdicate while claiming that the accusations against Nick were part of a sting operation.

Drew Wu

Drew Wu (played by Reggie Lee) is a police sergeant who works with Nick and Hank. He tends to do the "grunt work" for them, collecting facts and information. He is often sarcastic and has a dry sense of humor.

In "Island of Dreams," when Adalind gives Hank some Zaubertrank (love potion) cookies as part of her revenge plot against Nick, Wu eats one. Since the Zaubertrank was not created for him, it causes adverse effects. Nick advises him to visit the spice shop, but as he arrives he passes out and his face breaks out in lesions. Fortunately, Rosalee has seen this effect before and manages to quickly create a potion to cure him. The cure causes Wu to have brief hallucinations of everyone's faces melting, but is ultimately a success. Though cured of the welts and sickness, Wu is left with a lasting effect of the Zaubertrank – he tries to ingest inedible things, such as paper clips and coins. Two episodes later, in "Love Sick," Rosalee creates another potion that clears the last of the Zaubertrank effects. No, after-effects are shown and he has no memory of what he had been doing.

In "Mommy Dearest," he becomes traumatized by a Wesen called the Aswang – a creature whose inclusion was inspired by Filipino folklore. As a child, his grandmother told him stories of the Aswang which scared him. He sees one when trying to protect his childhood friend, Dana, which gives him flashbacks to his grandmother's storytelling. The trauma caused by this incident makes Wu check himself into a psychiatric hospital. Later, Juliette visits him and confides in Wu, sharing the experience of regaining her memories. She tells him she thought she was going crazy and seeing ghosts. When Wu asks how she got over thinking it was real, she tells him that it didn't matter whether it was real, what mattered was losing her fear of it. This has a big impact on Wu and he later feels well enough to check out of the hospital.

However, in "Chupacabra," he is told by Nick that Wesen is real, which puts him on edge, and eventually leaves him in a state of shock. After going to a bar in "Wesenrein" and causing a disturbance, Nick and Hank take him to the trailer, Wu learns that Nick is a Grimm. After saving Monroe's life, Wu becomes increasingly fascinated with the Wesen world and accurately deduces whenever a case has Wesen-like qualities.

In season 5, after being scratched by a Lycanthrope (a Blutbad with a genetic disease), he has night sweats, joint pains, and strange dreams. This culminates when, in a heightened emotional state, he transforms into a Neanderthal-like version of himself with enhanced strength and Wesen-like ferocity. At first, he blacks out and cannot recall what happened. Upon learning of his condition, Wu demonstrates greater control over his primal form, becoming self-aware and can distinguish friend from foe.  He even can use his powers to help others and fight off evil Wesen.

Rosalee Calvert

Rosalee Calvert (recurring season 1; regular seasons 2 to 6), (played by Bree Turner) is a fox-like creature, called a Fuchsbau, and the sister of Freddie, the proprietor of the herb shop used as a front for the Geier organ trafficking business seen in "Organ Grinder." After Freddie's death in "Island of Dreams," Rosalee comes to Portland to sort out her brother's affairs and decides to stick around. Before living in Portland she tried to follow her parents' profession as an apothecary, but despite her aptitude for it, did not like the job. She became hooked on a highly addictive Wesen-oriented street drug-named 'J' and left Portland to get clean. After deciding to keep her brother's shop running, Rosalee assists Nick and Monroe in their efforts by providing additional information and remedies to supernatural problems.

Rosalee shares a powerful connection with Monroe. In "Quill," they go on their first date and share their first kiss, after which Rosalee uncharacteristically attempts to seduce Monroe. This seduction attempt turns out to be the manifestation of a common symptom from the Wesen virus Rosalee had been exposed to during their date. After being cured, Rosalee and Monroe agree that the attraction between them was real, but decide to take it slow before becoming intimate with each other. In season 3, "A Dish Best Served Cold," Monroe asks Rosalee to move in with him and she does so in the next episode, "One Night Stand." In "The Wild Hunt," Monroe proposes to her and she accepts, but this is met with frosty reception from his parents who are very traditional about inter-species marriages. Monroe and his parents have since mended their relationship.

Rosalee marries Monroe at the end of season 3, but throughout half of season 4, they are stalked and ridiculed by a Wesen purity group called Wesenrein. After learning of Juliette's new status as a Hexenbiest, Rosalee tries to reach out to her. She is unsuccessful but does not give up trying to save her until Juliette almost killed Monroe. In season 5, she and the group get involved in a war between Hadrian's Wall and Black Claw. During this time, she becomes friends with Adalind after Kelly's birth. Tony, a former boyfriend, starts reaching out to her, and appears in "Into the Schwarzwald." He asks Rosalee for money and assaults her when she refuses. When Adalind defends herself and Rosalee from Tony, Rosalee sees that her powers have returned, and encourages her to tell Nick. Upon learning that she did not, Rosalee tells Nick about Adalind's powers returning but encourages him to let Adalind tell him in her own time.

In the season 5 finale, Rosalee reveals to Monroe that she is pregnant with their first child. In season 6, she and Monroe find out she is having triplets.

Adalind Schade

Adalind (recurring seasons 1 & 2 (part); regular seasons 2 (part) to 6), (played by Claire Coffee) is a witch-like creature called a Hexenbiest who seemed to be working for Renard during season 1. In "Love Sick," after ingesting Nick's blood, she becomes a completely normal human. Renard tells her that she is no longer useful to him since she is no longer a Wesen. Although not a true Hexenbiest anymore, Adalind retains her knowledge and skill with potions, and Nick now describes her as a witch. In "Woman in Black," she gets Juliette scratched by a poisoned (or magicked) cat. Monroe and Rosalee retrieve the cat but find that Adalind has vanished.

Sometime later, Adalind resurfaces in Vienna to rendezvous with Eric Renard. She becomes pregnant with the child of Eric or Sean Renard – which one is unspecified – then attempts to bargain with the royal families. She asks her Hexenbiest powers to be given back in return for the child, threatening to terminate the pregnancy if they do not do so.

In "Mommy Dearest," Adalind becomes a Hexenbiest again after giving birth to her daughter, whom she names Diana. Later, after beginning her search for her missing child, she discovers that she is pregnant with Nick's son. She lies to the royals about the child, claiming it is Viktor's, but Prince Kenneth uncovers the truth after informing her that Viktor is sterile. When he decides to lure Juliette into working for him to find Diana, Adalind tells Nick the truth about his child. Later, her powers are suppressed when she tests a potion meant for Juliette. After complications from giving birth to her son by C-section, she names him "Kelly" after Nick's late mother, who died protecting her daughter Diana.

Adalind becomes more compassionate after the birth of her son, even telling Rosalee that she does not want to be a Hexenbiest anymore; she does not want there to be friction between her and Nick that could affect Kelly. While she and Nick are living together to raise Kelly, they let go of past animosities and develop romantic feelings for one another. In episode 100, Adalind's Hexenbiest powers return when she defends herself against Rosalee's ex-boyfriend, breaking all of his fingers in the process. She fears that Nick would abandon her if he finds out her powers are back. During this time, she returns to her old job as a lawyer, but she is antagonized by Renard and Black Claw leader Bonaparte, who claim her daughter is with them. Soon, Adalind tells Nick the truth about her powers and her fears that Renard and Black Claw will use Diana to get to her. Given a dangerous ultimatum by Diana disguised as Renard, Adalind is forced to leave with Kelly. Despite Renard's attempts to win her back and Bonaparte threatening her, Adalind remains loyal to Nick, refusing to reveal his location to them. When Bonaparte tortures the location out of her, Adalind has Diana send Nick a message about the danger heading his way. Diana kills Bonaparte in revenge for the torture he put Adalind through.

It is assumed that Nick and Adalind got married sometime after the series finale.

Recurring characters

Marie Kessler
Marie Kessler (played by Kate Burton) is a Grimm who is Nick's aunt. She told Nick that she worked as a librarian, but it is unclear whether this was true or she worked as a Grimm full-time. She is injured by a reaper when she comes to visit Nick, although she was already dying of cancer. Despite assassination attempts being thwarted by Nick and Monroe, she eventually dies of her injuries in season 1, episode 2 – with her last words, she reminds Nick to fight "the bad ones." She leaves Nick her trailer, containing all of her books and tools about the creatures that he would face as a Grimm, which he keeps in the middle of a deserted storage lot and consults when necessary. She returns in the series finale along with Kelly, to help Nick in the final fight against the Zerstorer.

Kelly Kessler Burkhardt
Kelly Kessler Burkhardt (played by Mary Elizabeth Mastrantonio) is Nick Burkhardt's mother and is also a Grimm. Her first appearance is in the last episode of season 1 (episode 22). For 18 years, Nick believed that both of his parents had died in a car crash. After learning that he was a Grimm Nick discovers that his parents had been murdered; but in reality, Kelly has been alive the whole time. When Nick reunites with his mother in episode 23 (season 2, episode 1), she tells Nick that his father was killed in the car crash but that the woman with him was mistaken for Kelly by both the authorities and the killer. Kelly explains to Nick that she had pretended to be dead for 18 years because it was the best way to protect Nick from his father's murderer. Kelly assists Nick with his investigation on the attacks by the "Mauvais Dentes." Nick takes his mother to Marie's trailer, which Kelly and Marie had bought together after their father became ill. Later, in episode 24 (season 2, episode 2), Kelly talks with Catherine Schade in an attempt to find a cure for Juliette. Catherine tells Kelly that a prince is in Portland, but Kelly accidentally kills Catherine before being able to find out the prince's identity. At the end of the episode, Nick, thinking that she was going to Zakynthos to destroy the "coins of Zakynthos," takes Kelly to the train station. After Nick drives away from the station, Kelly is seen stealing a car instead of entering the station.

In season 3, she returns to Portland with Adalind and newly born Diana. She is last seen leaving in a truck with Adalind's baby, in an attempt to keep her safe.

In the season 4 episode, "Headache," Nick returns home to find Kelly's severed head in a box as a result of an ambush by the royals. He deduces that Juliette, working for the royals, lured Kelly into a trap so they could take Diana. Kelly never finds out that Adalind is pregnant with her grandson Kelly, who is named after her. Until the finale episode in season 6, where she tells Nick to look after her grandson, and that she likes the name they gave him.

Theresa "Trubel" Rubel
Theresa Rubel (played by Jacqueline Toboni) often known as Trubel (pronounced "trouble"), is a vagrant runaway and a Grimm, although she has no prior knowledge of what "Grimm" means. She has had to defend herself from wesen who recognizes her as a Grimm, but when she describes her experiences, she is called mad or lying. As a result, she spends time in several mental institutions. Monroe identifies her as a Grimm during their initial (and almost deadly) encounter. At the end of season 3, she is staying at Nick's home and learning about the world of Grimms and Wesen.

At the start of season 4, she acts as the local Grimm, keeping the bads of the Wesen community in check until Nick gets his powers back. After helping Nick find a way to get back to being a Grimm, she goes on her own with Josh Porter, to teach him how to fight and survive without Grimm's powers. She also aims to become her Grimm by searching for herself. She later returns to help after receiving a phone call from Monroe and Rosalee. She kills Juliette with a crossbow in the season 4 finale "Cry Havoc" because Juliette was trying to kill Nick. In season 5, she works for Hadrian's Wall along with Eve and Meisner but was still considered to be primarily an ally to Nick's team rather than a member of Hadrian's Wall, to the extent that Nick told her about the mystery healing stick while keeping it secret from the organization as a whole.

Dr. Harper
Dr. Harper (played by Sharon Sachs) is a medical examiner, who occasionally works on Nick and Hank's cases. In episode 13, she is beaten by a Schakal who was looking for the Coins of Zakynthos. Throughout "Three Coins in a Fuchsbau," Harper is referred to as "Parker."

Bud Wurstner
Bud Wurstner (played by Danny Bruno) is a beaver-like creature, called an Eisbiber, who first encounters Nick when he is repairing his fridge. He is initially frightened of Nick, believing him to be as violent as the mythical Grimms. Because of this, Bud behaves subserviently towards Nick, offering to fix things and giving Nick gifts. It is only after Nick calls upon Bud for help in a murder case that Bud realizes Nick is a good person. The two become friends, although he is still somewhat jittery when he and Nick meet. Bud played an important role in stopping a Wesen lawyer who used his pheromones to manipulate juries to favor his clients.

Franco
Sergeant Franco (played by Robert Blanche) is a police officer who works in the Homicide Department, apparently under Sergeant Wu. He appears to share many of Wu's duties and possibly fills in for Sergeant Wu whenever the latter is busy elsewhere.

Catherine Schade
Catherine Schade (played by Jessica Tuck) is a Hexenbiest and Adalind's mother. She is first seen in episode 17 (season 1, episode 17). She taught Adalind everything she knew about being a Hexenbiest. The last time she spoke to her daughter was episode 17 (season 1, episode 17) when Adalind ingests Nick's blood, removing her Hexenbiest abilities. She was accidentally killed in episode 24 (season 2, episode 2) by Nick's mother when the latter was trying to find a cure for Juliette.

Eric Renard
Eric Renard (played by James Frain) is the brother of Sean Renard. He is fluent in English and French and lives in a Norman-style castle. He first appears in episode 23 (season 2, episode 1) when he is seen approaching a man undergoing torture, demanding the names of people in the resistance. Eric is a recurring character in season 2. He arrives in Portland in the season finale in an attempt to abduct Nick involving an army of zombie-like individuals. Despite Eric's efforts, Nick manages to escape. Eric is killed by a bomb planted by Sean Renard in retaliation.

Sebastien
Sebastien (played by Christian Lagadec) is a lawyer in the service of Eric Renard's royal family. He is an undercover ally of Sean Renard and regularly aids him by providing information regarding the family. Viktor eventually discovers his betrayal and kills him in the episode "The Show Must Go On" (season 3, episode 16).

Ryan Smulson
Ryan Samuelson (played by Michael Grant Terry) is an intern at the Portland police department who appears to worship Nick. He is later revealed to be finding Wesen using police information, then torturing and killing them, similar to ancient historical Grimms. When Nick confronts him, he turns out to be a leech-like Wesen and is arrested.

Pilar
Pilar (played by Bertila Damas) is fluent in Spanish and English, who helps when Juliette loses her memory of Nick. Pilar has not been revealed to be Wesen or a Grimm, but she can identify that Juliette is cursed. She gives Juliette advice to allow her to regain her memories. In "El Cucuy," Juliette and Nick visit her again to ask if she knows about El Cucuy.

Stefania Vaduva Popescu
Stefania Vaduva Popescu (played by Shohreh Aghdashloo) is a Zigeverisprathes or Queen of Schwartzwald Roma at the House of Kronenberg. She helps Adalind get her Wesen powers back. She is a rival of Frau Pech.

Frau Pech
Frau Pech (played by Mary McDonald-Lewis) is a Hexenbiest who, at the cost of her life, helps Adalind recover her Hexenbiest powers.

Baron Samedi
Baron Samedi (played by Reg E. Cathey) is a Cracher-Mortel, a Wesen who works with Eric Renard. He arrives in Portland at the end of season 2 and turns several people into zombie-like creatures as a cover-up for the abduction of Nick. After being abducted, Nick wakes up on a plane leaving Portland and fights Baron Samedi, causing the plane to crash. Baron Samedi is killed in the crash, while Nick (and the other zombies) are eventually cured by Rosalee.

Viktor Albert Wilhelm George Beckendorf
Viktor Albert Wilhelm George Beckendorf (played by Alexis Denisof) is a second cousin of Eric and Sean Renard who becomes the new Crown Prince after Eric's death. He threatens Captain Renard with death if he doesn't give up Adalind's baby, to which Renard acquiesces. After a short time, the baby is put in the hands of Kelly Burkhardt, Nick's mother. He fools Adalind into thinking that he has her baby, which is revealed at the end of episode 71 (season 4, episode 5). When Adalind learns she was pregnant with Nick's child, she attempts to pass it off as Viktor's, but this backfires when it is revealed that Viktor is sterile.

Alexander
Alexander (played by Spencer Conway) a Wesen who works for the Wesen Council. He comes to Portland three different times. In the episode "Once We Were Gods," he asks Nick to stop someone from stealing an old mummy.

Martin Meisner
Martin Meisner (played by Damien Puckler) is a human member of the resistance.  While not a Grimm, Meisner can identify Wesen on sight and is familiar with the different types of Wesen, as well as their strengths and weaknesses.  He possesses superior combat skills and can easily defeat multiple Wesen in close combat. He helps deliver Adalind's daughter Diana and escorts them both from Austria to Switzerland. He returns in the season 4 season finale, rescuing Diana from the royal king and killing him in the process. In season 5 he goes back to Portland and works for Hadrian's Wall, a government-funded group that deals with Black Claw and the Wesen uprising. When special agent Chavez dies at the beginning of season 5, Meisner takes over as the head of Hadrian's Wall for the Portland compound. In the episode "Beginning of the End, Parts One and Two," Meisner is choked by Bonaparte, but Renard shoots him to prevent a slow death.

In the final season, his ghost haunts Renard.

Diana Schade-Renard
Diana Schade-Renard (played by Isley and Aria Zamora in season 3, Sloane McGinnis in season 4, and Hannah R. Loyd in seasons 5 and 6) is the daughter of Adalind Schade and Sean Renard. She is also the older half-sister of Kelly Schade-Burkhardt. She displays powers of telekinesis, pyrokinesis, casting illusions, and precognition. Her eyes tend to turn to glow purple whenever she uses her powers. Diana is seen riding in a truck with Kelly Burkhardt to an unknown location. She returns as a young child in the season 4 episode "Headache" with Kelly, when they are ambushed by the royals with the help of Juliette.

As a preteen, Diana reunites with her father in the season 5 episode "Inugami" with the help of Rachel Wood. In the episode "Good to the Bone," she is reunited with her mother. It is later revealed that her powers have grown considerably in the episode "The Taming of the Wu." She is now able to project her image as well as copy voices perfectly. When Diana loses her temper, she can be prone to using her abilities in fits of rage. One of Diana's signature uses of her powers is to create the image of a skull from various media, often meant as a warning. She is also able to use her powers to project a brief image of herself to her mother, though she is unable to hear Adalind trying to speak to the projection. Because of how Adalind assumed Juliette's identity in the past, and vice versa, Diana sometimes communicates with Eve inadvertently. Diana is further able to manipulate radio frequencies, a form of electromagnetic energy, to dial a specific cell phone. When doing so, she can also perform a perfect impersonation of any other individual's voice. Similar to how Henrietta could manipulate Nick's emotions when she was close to him, Diana can manipulate the emotions and actions of those within several feet of her. She can also manipulate people through the use of Voodoo dolls, which is how she killed Bonaparte once she learned what he did to her mother.

Josh Porter
Josh Porter (played by Lucas Near-Verbrugghe) is the non-Grimm son of Roland "Rolek" Porter. Rolek Porter, who was a Grimm, died in episode 65 (season 3, episode 21). After his father's death, Josh is tasked with giving Nick the Grimm tools and books owned by Roland, including one of the seven map keys. In episode 71 (season 4, episode 5), Josh gives Nick a call to tell him that "this Grimm stuff" is ruining his life. He says that his home in Philadelphia has been ransacked by members of the Verrat in search of the key. In episode 73 (season 4, episode 7), he is seen leaving with Trubel heading to Philadelphia.

Elizabeth Lascelles
Elizabeth Lascelles (played by Louise Lombard) is Sean Renard's mother and is also a Hexenbiest. Elizabeth had an affair with King Frederick, which resulted in Sean's birth. When the Queen found out, she sent people to have Elizabeth and Sean killed. Later, while her son is dying in the hospital, Elizabeth uses a two-headed snake to revive him. He then tells her of her granddaughter Diana's existence. Before she leaves, she tells Sean that she would be looking for her granddaughter and advises him to keep the witch's hat.

Henrietta
Henrietta (played by Garcelle Beauvais) is a Hexenbiest and old friend of Elizabeth Lascelles and Sean Renard, being one of the reasons they come to Portland. Sean sends Juliette to Henrietta to help her deal with her new Hexenbiest powers. She is killed by Sean Renard while he is under the influence of Jack the Ripper.

Kelly Burkhardt
Kelly Burkhardt (played by Owynn and Quinn Ingersoll, Emma and Claire Dezellem, and 2+ other sets of unknown twins in season 5) is the son of Adalind Schade and Nick Burkhardt, named after Nick's recently deceased mother Kelly Burkhardt. He is also the younger half-brother of Diana Schade-Renard. He is conceived when Adalind uses the potion to disguise herself as Juliette to take away Nick's Grimm powers by sleeping together. Adalind does not know she was pregnant until Henrietta senses it and tells her. Soon telling Nick that she was pregnant with his child, she reveals that she is having a boy. He is born by an emergency C-section due to his arm being above his head when Adalind was giving birth to him. He currently lives with his parents in Portland. Since Adalind's powers were suppressed before his birth, it is unknown whether he has Hexenbiest powers like his half-sister, or will have Nick's Grimm powers when he is older, or both.

Andrew Dixon
Andrew Dixon is a candidate running for mayor of Portland. His first appearance in the series is the season 5 episode "Wesen Nacht". He asks Sean Renard, a police captain, to endorse him so he would be elected for the mayor position. Renard supports him because he believes that Dixon is a good man. Dixon dies in the season 5 episode "Key Move" when he is assassinated by a Wesen terrorist working with Black Claw. Renard realizes Black Claw set this up so Renard could take his place as mayor of Portland.

Conrad Bonaparte
Conrad Bonaparte (played by Shaun Toub) is a powerful Zauberbiest and a co-founder of Black Claw who first appeared in the episode "The Taming of the Wu". He has significant involvement in Black Claw's manipulative plans. Bonaparte meets with Renard and is disappointed with the situation regarding Adalind and Diana. He also threatens to kill Adalind if she chooses to stay with Nick. Later, he meets Adalind and Kelly at her office, where he gives her an ultimatum. The ultimatum leads her to take Kelly to leave Nick. After having the talk with Adalind at the Black Claw's Hideout, Bonaparte reveals that he is a full Zauberbiest and uses his abilities to make Adalind believe that she is turning into stone. He also gives her an engagement ring but warns her what will happen to her children when she takes it off. After Bonaparte and Renard kill Meisner, Nick is enraged and gets arrested for assault on Renard. Bonaparte interrogates Nick with his powers of illusion to find the location of the Grimm ancestry book, which is in Nick's possession. However, he leaves after the fighting begins between the Black Claw members and Nick's friends. Later, after returning to the mansion, he uses his powers on Adalind to make her give up Nick's location. After a standoff between him, Renard and Nick, when Bonaparte uses his powers in an attempt to choke Nick to death, he is stabbed in the back by Renard, who is being controlled by Diana.

Creatures
The show refers to its numerous creatures as Wesen, which is German for creature or nature. While the species of each creature often has a German name, although disregarding correct spelling or grammatical, most of the Wesen in the series do not exist by these names in Grimms' Fairy Tales. Some creatures have different names in the German synchronization of the series. For example, the Fuchsbau ("fox den") are called fuchsteufel ("fox-devil") in the German translation of the series.

Wesen are theriomorphic humans with certain traits and abilities characteristic in animals or mythological creatures. The non-human traits and abilities appear when Wesen are aggressive or otherwise emotionally agitated, which is referred to as wogeing from the German wogen, meaning surge. According to the character Monroe, normal people can see only the human appearance of a Wesen, not the woged form. However, Wesen can allow themselves to be seen, which is the source of legends and stories passed down as fairy tales by The Brothers Grimm.

The Wesen community has its politics and institutions, led by the Wesen Council which has the functions of judiciary and legislature. Separately, the seven Royal Houses in Europe are aware of the Wesen community in the series and are vying to restore their former influence in the world. It is never clearly stated in the series whether members of the Royal families are Wesen themselves; however Wesen–Royal romantic relationships are frowned upon.

Wesen and others

References
 Grimm, Universal Television et al., 2011–2014.

Characters
Grimm
Grimm
Grimm